William Harrison Graham (August 3, 1844 – March 2, 1923) was a U.S. Representative from the state of Pennsylvania.

Biography
William H. Graham was born in Allegheny, Pennsylvania (now part of Pittsburgh, Pennsylvania).  During the American Civil War, he enlisted on April 5, 1861, in the Second Regiment of the Virginia Infantry of the Union Army.  After a service of two years, the unit was mounted and became the Fifth Regiment of West Virginia Cavalry.  He was mustered out June 14, 1864.  He engaged in the leather business in Allegheny.  He served as a member of the Pennsylvania State House of Representatives from 1875 to 1878, and as Recorder of deeds of Allegheny County, Pennsylvania, from 1882 to 1891.  He was also engaged in banking.

Graham was elected as a Republican to the Fifty-fifth Congress to fill the vacancy caused by the resignation of William A. Stone.  He was reelected to the Fifty-sixth and Fifty-seventh Congresses.  He was an unsuccessful candidate for reelection in 1902.  He was again elected to the Fifty-ninth, Sixtieth, and Sixty-first Congresses.  He served as chairman of the United States House Committee on Ventilation and Acoustics during the Sixtieth Congress, and of the United States House Committee on Expenditures in the Department of Agriculture during the Sixty-first Congress.  He was an unsuccessful candidate in the Republican primaries for renomination.  After his time in Congress, he served as a member of the Allegheny County Board of Viewers from 1911 to 1923.  He died in Pittsburgh in 1923 and was interred in Highwood Cemetery.

References
 Retrieved on 2008-02-14
The Political Graveyard

1844 births
1923 deaths
Republican Party members of the Pennsylvania House of Representatives
Union Army soldiers
Politicians from Pittsburgh
Republican Party members of the United States House of Representatives from Pennsylvania